South Texas Swimming (ST) is the governing body for competitive swimming in South Texas. It is an LSC member of USA Swimming and the Southern Zone. Most of the athletes who compete in South Texas swim meets are youths under the age of 18. However, there are also opportunities for older members of the swimming community to compete.

Location
South Texas is one of the 59 sub-divided areas by the National Governing Board, which is USA Swimming. The area that South Texas covers is Austin, Corpus Christi, Texas, McAllen, Texas, San Antonio, and Temple, Texas in South Texas

Athlete Members
Nearly 5,000 individuals are registered South Texas athlete members. These athletes compete across 46 different swim clubs The level of competition across the clubs varies greatly, from recreational swimming to Olympians. Some of the notable athletes who have come from South Texas include Joshua Davis and Scott Spann.

Competitions and Events
South Texas sanctions at least 50 swimming competitions per year.  Most of these are competed in Short Course Yards and Long Course Meters.

B Championship

BB Championship

A Championship

TAGS

Southern Zone Championship

Governance
The South Texas LSC is run by its board of directors.

References

Swimming organizations
Swimming in Texas